Vard Mamikonian (Armenian: Վարդ Մամիկոնյան) was an Armenian nobleman from the Mamikonian family. He served as the marzban of Persian Armenia from 505/510 to 509/514.

Biography 

Vard Mamikonian was the third son of Hmayeak Mamikonian and Dzoyk Artsruni. He had an elder brother named Vahan I Mamikonian including two other brothers named Vasak and Artaxias. During his youth, he was a hostage in Persia, but was later released. In 505/510, he succeeded his elder brother Vahan I Mamikonian as Marzban of Persian Armenia. According to Sebeos and Stepanos Asoghik, Vard carried the Byzantine title of patrikios, however, neither the contemporary historian Ghazar Parpetsi nor other historians mentioned that he carried the title, making it probably a misinterpretation of two historians. Vard was removed from his office four years later and was deported to Persia by order of the Sasanian king Kavadh I, where he died after a short time.

Vard's removal from the Marzban office, put an end to the short-lived Armenian autonomy which lasted c. 25 years. King Kavadh I, however, maintained religious freedom in Armenia because of fear of rebellion, and in order to maintain good relations with the Byzantine Empire.

Sources 
 
 
 
 
 

 

450 births
500s deaths
Sasanian governors of Armenia
Armenian Christians
Vard Mamikonian
6th-century Iranian people
Patricii
6th-century Armenian people
Armenian people from the Sasanian Empire